Richard "Ricky" Evensand is a Swedish drummer and contributed for several music bands: Therion (2001-2004), Chimaira (2003-2004), Ebony Tears, Sorcerer, Dog Faced Gods, Soilwork, Demonoid, Southpaw, Stardown.

He currently resides in Australia and is the drummer in Gretchen Lewis and Toehider. Ricky performs live regularly as Australian session drummer for Black Majesty as well as a variety of freelance sessions. He recently did a clinic tour of Australia for renowned drum company Mapex.

References

External links
Toehider

Therion (band) members
Swedish heavy metal drummers
Living people
Chimaira members
Demonoid (band) members
Soilwork members
Year of birth missing (living people)